Lesly Marguerite Malouda (born 16 November 1983) is a French Guianan former professional footballer who played as a defender.

Club career

Youth
Born in Kourou, French Guiana, Malouda played football in his teenage years for the French Guiana club ASC Le Geldar and visited the Collége Henri Agrande in Kourou.

Senior
Malouda began his professional career with RC Lens being promoted to the Ligue 1 team in summer 2004. After eight games in his first season was loaned out by Lens and joined for Istres for the 2005–06 season playing 26 games scoring two goals. In August 2006, After his return to Lens, he was demoted to the reserves.

After one year with the B team he left for Toulouse Fontaines Club in July 2007. After one year with the club he joined Atlético Baleares of Mallorca in August 2008. On 17 July 2009, Dijon signed Malouda on a free transfer.

International career
Malouda made his international debut for French Guiana, his region of birth, on 6 September 2012 in a friendly against Suriname. He was part of French Guiana's squad for the 2012 Caribbean Championship.

Personal life
Lesly is the brother of former Chelsea winger Florent Malouda.

References

External links
 

1986 births
Living people
People from Kourou
French footballers
French Guianan footballers
French Guiana international footballers
Association football midfielders
Expatriate footballers in Spain
French expatriate sportspeople in Spain
RC Lens players
FC Istres players
Toulouse Fontaines Club players
Dijon FCO players
Ligue 1 players
Ligue 2 players